The Stolen Bacillus and Other Incidents is a collection of fifteen fantasy and science fiction short stories written by the English author H. G. Wells between 1893 and 1895. It was first published by Methuen & Co. in 1895 and was Wells's first book of short stories. All of the stories had first been published in various weekly and monthly periodicals.

Contents
These are the short stories contained in this collection showing the periodicals in which they were first published.
"The Stolen Bacillus" (Pall Mall Budget, 21 June 1894)
"The Flowering of the Strange Orchid" (Pall Mall Budget, 2 August 1894)
"In the Avu Observatory" (Pall Mall Budget, 9 August 1894)
"The Triumphs of a Taxidermist" (Pall Mall Gazette, 3 March 1894)
"A Deal in Ostriches" (Pall Mall Budget, 20 December 1894)
"Through a Window" (Black and White, 25 August 1894)
"The Temptation of Harringay" (The St. James’s Gazette, 9 February 1895)
"The Flying Man" (Pall Mall Gazette, December 1893)
"The Diamond Maker" (Pall Mall Budget, 16 August 1894)
"Æpyornis Island" (Pall Mall Budget, 27 December 1894)
"The Remarkable Case of Davidson’s Eyes" (Pall Mall Budget, 28 March 1895)
"The Lord of the Dynamos" (Pall Mall Budget, 6 September 1894)
"The Hammerpond Park Burglary" (Pall Mall Budget, 5 July 1894)
"The Moth" (Pall Mall Gazette, 28 March 1895)
"The Treasure in the Forest" (Pall Mall Budget, 23 August 1894)

External links
 
 
The Stolen Bacillus and Other Incidents. Project Gutenberg.
 
The Stolen Bacillus and Other Incidents. Index to Science Fiction Anthologies and Collections.

Short story collections by H. G. Wells
1895 short story collections
Methuen Publishing books
Speculative fiction short story collections